Rhetorical figure may refer to:
Figure of speech
Rhetorical device
Literary trope